The EPRDF Youth League was the youth wing of the Ethiopian People's Revolutionary Democratic Front (EPRDF). The organization was established in May 2009. The EPRDF was organized under the four member organizations of EPRDF and two administrative councils.
EPRDF was dissolved on 1 December 2019 and succeeded by the Prosperity Party.

References

External links
EPRDF Youth League website

Ethiopian People's Revolutionary Democratic Front
Youth wings of political parties in Ethiopia
Youth organizations established in the 2000s